Un grand cri d'amour (A great cry of love) is a 1998 French comedy film directed by Josiane Balasko. It was first seen as a play, which premièred in 1996 at the Théâtre de la Michodière with Josiane Balasko and Richard Berry in the main roles.

Plot 
Sylvestre (Daniel Ceccaldi), theater producer, sees his latest production threatened as the main actress unexpectedly departs from the project due to her pregnancy.
To avoid calling off the production, he immediately seeks replacement and tries to convince the quick-tempered Hugo Martial (Richard Berry), only actor left, to work with Gigi Ortega (Josiane Balasko), an alcoholic and conceited woman, with whom he once formed a famed duo before their marriage fell apart. Léon (Daniel Prévost), director of the play, now has to rehearse day in and day out with two hateful and resentful actors, both settling accounts onstage, while Sylvester schemes a whole host of tricks to ensure the play sees it through.

Cast 

 Josiane Balasko as Gigi Ortega
 Richard Berry as Hugo Martial
 Daniel Prévost as Léon
 Daniel Ceccaldi as Sylvestre
 Claude Berri as Maillard
 Nadia Barentin as Bernadette
 Jean-Claude Bouillon as The journalist
 Philippe Bruneau as René
 Jean Sarrus as Jacky
 Jean-Michel Tinivelli as Jean-Paul
 Nicolas Silberg as The medecin
 Michel Field as himself

Production
In 1998, the movie was screened at the Toronto International Film Festival and in 2009, at the Festival du Film Francophone in Greece.

References

External links

1998 films
1998 comedy films
French comedy films
1990s French-language films
Films directed by Josiane Balasko
1990s French films